Irish Open may refer to:

Irish Open (golf), a golf tournament on the European Tour
Irish Senior Open, a golf tournament on the European Seniors Tour 
Ladies Irish Open, a golf tournament on the Ladies European Tour
Irish Open (darts), annual darts tournament
Irish Open (tennis), a men's and women's tennis tournament
Irish Open (badminton), international badminton tournament
Irish Poker Open, a No Limit Texas hold 'em poker tournament